Delphin Strungk (or Strunck) (1600 or 1601 – 12 October 1694) was a German composer and organist associated with the North German school.

The first that is known of him is in 1630, when he became organist of the Marienkirche in Wolfenbüttel; this was followed by an appointment at the court in Celle from 1632 to 1637. In May 1637, he moved to Brunswick, where he was to remain until his death, to take up the post of organist of the St. Martini church; he also played at other local churches.

His surviving compositions include six pieces of church music for voices and instruments, now in the collection of the Herzog August Bibliothek, Wolfenbüttel and the Staatsbibliothek zu Berlin Preussischer Kulturbesitz. There are also surviving organ works; six chorale preludes and fantasias of a high quality survive in tablature, and are now in the collection of the Ratsbücherei, Lüneburg. These have been published in Die Orgel, II/12 (Lippstadt, 1960); Alte Meister des Orgelspiels, ed. K. Straube (Leipzig, 1904); Seasonal Chorale Preludes with Pedals I, ed. C. H. Trevor (London, 1963); and Corpus of Early Keyboard Music XXIII (1973).

His son Nicolaus Adam Strungk was an opera composer.

References
Gwilym Beechey, "Strungk [Strunck], Delphin", Grove Music Online ed. L. Macy (Accessed 2007-06-08), http://www.grovemusic.com/ 
M. Seiffert: Zur Biographie Delphin Struncks, Archiv für Musikwissenschaft, II (1920)

Scores
 

1600s births
1694 deaths
Year of birth uncertain
Musicians from Braunschweig
People from Brunswick-Lüneburg
German Baroque composers
German classical organists
Organists and composers in the North German tradition
German male organists
17th-century classical composers
German male classical composers
17th-century male musicians
Male classical organists